Rinzia carnosa, commonly known as the fleshy leaved rinzia, is a plant species of the family Myrtaceae endemic to Western Australia.

It has many branches with long slim branchlets. It blooms in September producing white-pink flowers.

It is found in the south eastern Wheatbelt and the Goldfields-Esperance regions of Western Australia between Corrigin and Jerramungup where it grows in sandy-loamy soils often over granite. The plant is usually part of the understorey in thickets of Acacia shrub communities.

The species was originally formally described as Baeckea carnosa by the botanist S.Moore in 1920 in the work A contribution to the Flora of Australia. in the Journal of the Linnean Society. It was subsequently reclassified into the genus Rinzia in 1986 as part of the work Reinstatement and revision of Rinzia Schauer (Myrtaceae, Leptospermeae, Baeckeinae) in the journal Nuytsia.

References

carnosa
Endemic flora of Western Australia
Myrtales of Australia
Rosids of Western Australia
Plants described in 1986